Emilio Frey (February 2, 1872 – May 29, 1964) was a Swiss Argentine geographer.

Life 
Emilio Enrique Frey was born in Baradero, Argentina, as the oldest of nine children. His father was a Swiss immigrant and farmer of the Swiss colony at Baradero, Buenos Aires Province, his mother was Argentine.

He attended school in Switzerland from 1884 through 1892, staying first with his grandfather Rudolf Frey in Zurich, then continuing at the Technikum in Winterthur, today part of the Zürcher Hochschule für Angewandte Wissenschaften, where he studied cartography and got an engineering degree in 1892.

Dr. Francisco P. Moreno, called Perito Moreno, asked Frey to join the Comisión de Limites Argentina-Chile in 1896. This commission was charged with the representation of Argentine interests in the border disputes with Chile, as the former treaty reached in 1881 Boundary treaty of 1881 between Chile and Argentina was contested by both countries. Many expeditions to the relevant parts of Patagonia were necessary. Frey could apply all his knowledge in topography and geography acquired in Europe. He discovered lakes such as Cholila, Rivadavia and Epuyen and produced maps.

During intense discussions the British government acted as arbiter between Chilean and Argentine interests resulting in a new treaty in 1902 Treaty of Arbitration between Chile and Argentina of 1902.

The Argentine minister for agriculture Ramos Mejia established another commission to study the hydrology of Northern Patagonia in 1910, which was led by professor Bailey Willis, a US geologist. Frey was his Argentine deputy.
When they reached one of the lakes discovered by Frey earlier, which was not yet officially named, Willis proposed to call it Lago Frey in 1913 :es:Lago Frey.

For the services Francisco Moreno provided as commissioner during the border disputes, the Argentine state granted him extensive land titles in Patagonia. Moreno in turn gave back to Argentina a large area close to the Nahuel Huapi Lake under the condition, that this land should be protected as a national park. When this national park was established, Frey became its first superintendent. He kept this role after the park was renamed Nahuel Huapi National Park :es:Parque Nacional Nahuel Huapi.

Frey was cofounder of the Club Andino Bariloche, the first mountaineering club in Argentina, in 1931. He became its first president and continued in this role for 30 years.

Honors 
 A mountain refuge in the Nahuel Huapi National Park was named Refugio Emilio Frey after him.
 Lago Frey carries his name.

References 

Argentine people of Swiss descent
Argentine explorers
1872 births
1964 deaths